Panasonic Lumix DMC-LZ30 is a digital camera by Panasonic Lumix. The highest-resolution pictures it records is 16.1 megapixels, through its 25mm Wide-Angle Lens.

Property
35x optical long zoom
25-875mm
HD Video capture
creative effects
DSLR like exposure control features

References

External links
DMC-LZ30K on shop.panasonic.com
Panasonic Lumix DMC-LZ30 Review

Bridge digital cameras
LZ30